The Somerset cannon was a British cannon designed within the Admiralty and manufactured by Armstrong's.

Its genesis was the unexpected failure of the Armstrong breech-loading rifles recently developed and installed on Royal Navy ships. The Somerset was a 6.5 ton 9.2-inch calibre smoothbore muzzle-loader, firing a 100-pound shot. With a charge of 33 pounds of gunpowder, a steel shot could penetrate 5.5 inches of armour at 800 yards.

Providing a mounting which could reliably be worked at sea proved difficult for a piece of this size. Traditional truck carriages were inadequate; historical research revealed that a carriage which was suitable had been suggested by Captain Sir Thomas Hardy (Nelson's Flag Captain) many years before. In this system the gun-carriage remained stationary, and the recoil of the gun was absorbed by a system of sliding friction blocks attached to the carriage and to the gun.

Naval guns of the United Kingdom
Victorian-era weapons of the United Kingdom